The Campbell Court Hotel is a historic building located at 1115 Southwest 11th Avenue in Portland, Oregon, United States. It is listed on the National Register of Historic Places.

History
Completed in 1923, the building has also been known as the Martha Washington Hotel and the Hotel Rajneesh.  It was bombed in 1983, while operating as Hotel Rajneesh. Following a $18 million renovation, the building started being used to as affordable housing for more than 100 residents in mid 2010.

See also
 Campbell Hotel, also listed on the National Register in Portland and now known as the Campbell Court Apartments
 National Register of Historic Places listings in Southwest Portland, Oregon

References

1923 establishments in Oregon
Defunct hotels in Portland, Oregon
Hotel buildings completed in 1923
Hotel buildings on the National Register of Historic Places in Portland, Oregon
Neoclassical architecture in Oregon
Southwest Portland, Oregon
Rajneesh movement